American singer-songwriter Madonna, throughout her career, spanning five decades, has obtained a remarkable series of statistical achievements, setting and breaking several world records with her participation in entrepreneurial activities, of acting and her performance in the musical scene for her videos, singles, albums, and tours.

Her first appearance in the Guinness Book of World Records was in 1986 with her third studio album, True Blue. Thereafter she has earned multiple appearances, including her title as the world's best-selling female recording artist in history, recognized since the 20th century. As of February 2012, she retained 20 entries at the same time in the Guinness World Records, a very similar figure obtained by Paul McCartney in 2003; the highest number of record holding at same time by a musician with 26.

Madonna's commerciality and numbers has achieved scrutiny from different point of view in the academia world or by marketers. However, she also scored some less favourable records, such as the most Golden Raspberry won by a female or then the largest drop by a number-one album in the Nielsen SoundScan period during its second week. A large array of outlets, including music trade magazines or newspapers of record, have nicknamed Madonna variety due her success, such as the "Queen of Charts", "Queen of the Hot 100", "Queen of Dance Clubs" or an "Airplay queen". In 1992, Bob Tannenbaum from The New York Times called to her as "the most statistically significant artist of the 80s".

Overall, Madonna has been placed high in the summary and anniversaries of record charts in various major music markets. That's the case in the United Kingdom, named by Official Charts Company (OCC) as "the most successful female artist in UK charts history". In Germany, was named "the most successful singles artist" by GfK Entertainment charts and in the United States, "the most successful solo artist of the Billboard Hot 100", as well "the most successful act of the Dance Club Songs" and fifth "Greatest Chart All-Stars" (all charts combined). The Guinness also recognized her as the most successful US DVD chart artist. Furthermore, she is both the most successful female artist in the RPM charts and in Music & Media charts of the continental Europe.

Critical commentaries
Madonna's records, achievements and statistics have been commented by the press, business theorists and other observers. After ending her first decade of her career, the 1980s, Bob Tannenbaum from The New York Times called her in 1992, "the most statistically significant artist of the 80s". In 2019, Vanessa Grigoriadis from same newspaper, called her "world's highest-charting female musician".

By 2004 Roger Blackwell stated "she has eclipsed the commercial accomplishments of many other more talented musicians because of the overall package she has created". The Cut editor Rebecca Harrington paraphrasing said in 2013, "Madonna's actual accomplishments are too much for the modern human to even contemplate". In 2008, Damian Corless from Irish Independent said "Madonna's stunning vital statistics are all her own work". In the same year, 2008, Nina Simosko from American business magazine Fast Company commented that she "has achieved accomplishments unrivaled by any other artists in the music industry ever". Prior years, in 1991, British rock music journalist, John Tobler shared similar feelings about her records:

At the height of her peak success, authors Ray B. Browne and William Labov observed that "after the release of her eponymous 1983 debut album", Madonna's songs reached the top of the pop charts with unprecedented regularity". Greg Seigworth wrote in the academic compendium The Madonna Connection (1993): "Madonna's visibility and numbers overseas (her sales abroad are more than double her domestic sales) are hard to overlook".

Madonna was nicknamed variously for her success in different formats. For example, the staff of Billboard named her as the "Queen of Charts", "Queen of the Hot 100", the "Queen of Dance Clubs", or "Queen of Touring". Forbes contributor Hugh McIntyre named Madonna the "Queen of Billboard charts", while Music & Media called "Airplay queen". Devon Maloney from Spin headlined her as the "Queen of Album sales", and The Daily Telegraph viewed her as a "chart queen".

Madonna's responses and reviews on them 
Music writer Dave McAleer, made the question in Chart Beats (1991): "Does Madonna cherish all the records she has broken?". Madonna has talked about in multiple times about her sales, numbers, awards and records. In an interview with British magazine Mojo she expressed that awards "are overrated" and they don't represent the success of her career and admits she pays no heed to her accolades. Priors years, she refused awards such as the Hollywood Walk of Fame in 1990. Back in 1987, United Press International reported that Madonna was "nonchalant" for the honor of receiving two awards from the first edition of World Music Video Awards. After winning the Music & Media award "Eurochart Artist Of The Decade" in 1994, she recalls about record charts: "I am not obsessed with chart positions [...] I don't buy magazines to see the charts. I rely on my management to call me to inform me on chart positions. I'd rather be distantly aware of it than putting too much importance to it".

In an interview with British journalist Simon Garfield in 2004, she told: "At the end of the day when I'm standing at the golden gates, I'm sure God doesn't give a shit how many records I've sold or how many number one hits I've had. All he gives a shit about is how I behaved, how I treated people". A similar situation occurred in an interview with Howard Stern, when he reminded Madonna about her 300 million record sales, and for which she answered: "Yeah, I don't focus on my accomplishments, I focus on things I haven't done yet". Carrie Havranek, wrote in Women Icons of Popular Music (2009), that she "is not necessarily interested when her manager tells her how quickly a concert has sold out; she is more interested in whether she is satisfied with it as an artistic achievement".

Definitions

 Many records that weren't featured at the Guinness, are supplied by official measures firms, record charts, trade magazines or by others notable reference books
 Weekly, hour or yearly general achievements such as those from Billboard Year-End aren't included here, if don't represent an all-time records, by genre or cumulative feats
 Decennials feats are generally excluded, with some exceptions apply
 Madonna's personal accomplishments such as "the most weeks spend" from a title in her catalog at a determinate record chart are excluded, unless represent a general achievement by any artist
 In many places, Madonna is one of a selected group to have specific accomplishments but these feats aren't usually included, unless represent Madonna being the "first" or having the "most" at some point

Selected global and regional records and achievements

Except for the top position that belongs to "Scream" by Michael and Janet Jackson, Madonna has the second, third and fourth most expensive videos in the industry. Just behind Michael Jackson and Celine Dion, Madonna along with the Beatles, Pink Floyd and Whitney Houston have three albums with sales of over 20 million copies sold worldwide, while she is the woman with most album of 10 million units sold.

Numerous of her tours are ranked as the highest-grossing in terms of decades, female or of all-time. Madonna also remains the only woman in history to have two solo concerts with 100,000 sold tickets; her Who's That Girl World Tour's concert in Parc de Sceaux, Paris, drew over 130,000 audience, while her Girlie Show's concert in Maracanã Stadium, Rio de Janeiro, drew over 120,000 audience.

Companies record

Europe

Ending the 1980s, Madonna topped the three Music & Media charts of that time during two different years, a feat achieved only before by Michael Jackson (1987 and 1988), thus make the first female singer to reach that feat in Europe. In 1986, Madonna became the first and only female artist to have her entire album catalog charted in the year-end European charts. Madonna is the first artist to dominate the Music & Media Year-End awards in three different years (1985, 1986 and 1987).

Australia

Her number-one albums (female record) span five decades in Australia (female record): 1980s, 1990s, 2000s, 2010s and 2020s. According to Australian magazine The Music Network, "all her albums have been hits" in the country, "one of the first markets to break her". Based in a Noise11.com article in 2019, until the release of Madame X, all her 14 studios albums entered at the Top-ten in the country, and a total of 20 of her releases (including compilations and soundtracks). In 2022, she attained another top-ten album with Finally Enough Love debuting at number-one position. 

Her number-one singles (female record), span three different decades: 1980s, 1990s and 2000s.

Brazil

Canada

Both Madonna number ones albums and singles in Canada (the most by any other act) span four consecutive decades: 1980s, 1990s, 2000s and 2010s. She achieved two diamond albums in the country.

Chile

France

All her major album catalog, including compilations and soundtracks, and with the exception of Celebration and Rebel Heart Tour have reached the Top-10 in France, including 7 number-one, 10 number-two and 3 number-three. She also has three albums with a Diamond status in the country.

Germany

As of 2018, Madonna spent a combinative 1,632 weeks (31 years) at the German charts, divided in 884 weeks for singles and 748 weeks in albums. With her charted songs from 1983 to 2018, she was always a Top 100 singles charter artist. Ray of Light is also one of the best-selling albums in Germany. Her number-one albums (female record) span four decades in Germany: 1980s, 1990s, 2000s and 2010s.

Italy

Japan

She became the first and only international artist with number-one albums in three consecutive decades: 1980s (Like a Prayer), 1990s (I'm Breathless) and 2000s (Hard Candy). In the 1980s, she scored two of the best-selling albums of that decade, the most by any other foreign act. As of 2019, she is tied with Mariah Carey, and both are behind South Korean female artists Twice and BoA, as the international female artist with most number-one albums on the Oricon Weekly Charts.

Netherlands

United Kingdom

She is also the first female singer to have had two albums that both contained five different UK Top 40 singles. In addition, she is the first female to have a studio album that feature the most UK number-one singles, with True Blue (3), a feat later surpassed by Jess Glynne (5) and Spice Girls and Lady Gaga, with four each.

Madonna has scored number-one albums (female record) across four consecutive decades: 1980s, 1990s, 2000s and 2010s. Madonna has never missed the top-ten with a studio album, and only one didn't make the top-five: her self-titled debud which peaked at 6. All of them have been number-one or number-two until the release of Madame X.

During the 2000s, she scored more number-one singles by a female artist, with five. Her UK number-one singles (female record) span three decades: 1980s, 1990s and 2000s.

2007 was the first year since Madonna's career began that she didn't have a single appear on the chart at all. She'd previously had years without any new entries –1988 and 2004– but there had been a couple of songs lingering in the Top 40 from the previous year. Her singles have spent 516 weeks as of 2022, in the Top 40 since her first hit in 1984, nearly 10 years.

United States

United States and United Kingdom (simultaneous) 

At some point of her career, the Guinness and British Hit Singles & Albums named Madonna the most successful female artist in both United Kingdom and the States. The 1988 edition of the Guinness, named her the "female leading vocalist" that has headed the single charts regularly in Britain and the US since her "Holiday" single in June 1984. Madonna is the first U.S. artist ever to go straight in at the top of the Official Albums Chart; she did it with True Blue.

She is one of the selected female artists to have one or more simultaneous UK and US number-one albums (True Blue and MDNA). She is indeed, the first female artist to have a simultaneous UK and US number-one album, with True Blue. "Like a Prayer" is also a simultaneous UK and US number-one single.

Selected other countries

Madonna at chart anniversary-lists (worldwide)
Madonna was placed high in record charts of most major musical markets, either as soloist or female artist. Madonna is the first female artist ranked in Billboards "Greatest Pop Stars" (created in 1981). She is also, the first artist to repeat as a year's "Greatest Pop Star": in 1985 and again in 1989.

Money-earns records and achievements

Madonna at Forbes earning lists
Madonna appeared in Forbes earning lists in four different decades: 1980s, 1990s, 2000s and 2010s. Across these decades, she featured multiple times as the top-grossing female musician.

Author Clifford Thompson, noticed that for several years running, she was listed high remaining among the Top Ten highest-paid entertainers, while biographer Adam Sexton summed up she stayed near the top. Madonna indeed, was ranked as "the highest-grossing woman in entertainment" for a while according to Forbes themselves prior to 1990. That year, they stated: "While performers like Whitney Houston and Cyndi Lauper rise fast and fade fast, Madonna has stayed near the top for all five years Forbes has compiled its list of America's highest-earning entertainers". Around those decades, only Oprah Winfrey prevented Madonna to reach the title of highest-grossing woman in entertainment in multiple years; the only time Madonna ranked above any entertainer in terms of money-earnings was in 2013.

In addition, Madonna is the first female singer to earn more than $100 million within a single year twice (2009 and 2013). She also topped the first inaugural Forbes list "Cash Queens of Music" in 2007. As of 2017, she was the second highest-ranked entertainer in Forbes America's wealthiest women, just behind Winfrey.

Madonna ended as the top-earning female in the entertainment industry

Madonna second only behind Oprah Winfrey in the whole entertainment industry

</onlyinclude>

Records about and inspired in Madonna 

Madonna as a subject has generated records titles by others ways in Guinness Book of World Records. They said: "You might not be able to run as fast as Michael Johnson, or sell as many records as Madonna but everyone can set a record".

See also 
 List of fastest-selling products
 List of most expensive divorces
 Fashion of Madonna: Records and feats on magazine covers

References

Book sources

Further reading

The 20 Most Valuable Records Ever
10 very expensive vinyl singles
Here Are the 50 Most Valuable Vinyl Records on Earth
Madonna's Signature Ranks Among "Top 10 Most Valuable Living Autographs"
The 20 Biggest Recording Contracts Of All Time
Largest vocabulary for a recording artist
Music of the 1990s
Super Expensive Weddings

External links 

Records and achievements
Madonna